Laterina is a frazione of Laterina Pergine Valdarno in the Province of Arezzo in the Italian region Tuscany, located about  southeast of Florence and about  northwest of Arezzo.

References

External links

 Laterina.it

Cities and towns in Tuscany